Kim Bo-ra (born 8 September 1969) is a South Korean politician serving as Mayor of Anseong in Gyeonggi Province and its first woman mayor from April 2020.

Before entering politics in 2014, Kim led various Non-governmental organisations on Social enterprise, medical cooperatives and local social welfare.

In the 2014 election, Kim was placed as number 3 of the proportional list of her party for Gyeonggi Provincial legislature. Since then, she took numerous roles in Gyeonggi Assembly, Gyeonggi branch of her party and her party at Gyeonggi Assembly. She also took multiple roles in her party - vice chair of its Social economy Committee, Special Committee on Fine Dust and Women's Committee as well as director of Social Economy centre of party thinktank.

Before running for mayor, Kim was the deputy spokesperson of her party.

In the 2020 by-election Kim ran for Mayor of Anseong City - the post vacated by Woo Seok-jae from her party who was removed from the office after the Supreme Court found Woo guilty of breaking the election law.

Kim was previously an adjunct professor of nursing at Sangmyung University from 2013 to 2014 and Soonchunhyang University from 2005 to 2007 as well as a visiting professor at Hanshin University from 2017 to 2018.

Kim holds two degrees - a bachelor in nursing from Yonsei University and a master's in social welfare from Pyeongtaek University.

Electoral history

References 

1969 births
Living people
Minjoo Party of Korea politicians
21st-century South Korean women politicians
21st-century South Korean politicians
Mayors of places in South Korea
Yonsei University alumni
Anseong